Anniyur is a village in the Kudavasal taluk of Tiruvarur district, Tamil Nadu, India.

Demographics 

 census, Anniyur had a total population of 2067 with 1081 males and 986 females. The sex ratio was 912. The literacy rate was 83.59.

References 

 

Villages in Tiruvarur district